Mohamed Bouchiche (born February 24, 1962, in Oran) is an Algerian former boxer who fought in the heavyweight division. He participated for two times at the olympic games 1980 and 1984. He won many national and international titles.

Career

 Preliminaries (1/8) Olympic Games - Moscow, Soviet Union 1980  (81 kg)
 Preliminaries (1/8) Olympic Games - Los Angeles, USA 1984   (91 kg)
  Mediterranean Games Casablanca, Morocco 1983 (+81 kg)
  Mediterranean Game Latakia, Syria 1987  (91 kg)
   Arab Championships - Bagdad, Iraq 1980  (81 kg)
  All-Africa Games ( Nairobi, Kenya) 1987  (91 kg)
   Pan Arab Games Rabat, Morocco 1985 (91 kg)

International tournaments 

  24 Fevrier Tournament - Algiers, Algeria 1985 (+81 kg)
  President's Cup Jakarta, Indonesia 1986 (+81 kg)
  Trofeo Italia - Venice, Italy  1986  (91 kg)
  Tammer Tournament - Tampere, Finland 1986  (91 kg)
   Feliks Stamm Memorial - Warsaw, Poland 1983 (91 kg)
 Quarter-finals Goodwill Games - Moscow, Soviet Union 1986 (91 kg)

Pro career
Bouchiche turned pro in 1988 and had some success. He was African professional champion in the 90'.

Olympic results
1980 Moscow
Round of 16: Lost to Pawel Skrzecz (Poland) by walkover

1984 Los Angeles
Lost to Willie de Wit (Canada) 0-5

Professional boxing record

| style="text-align:center;" colspan="8"|3 Wins (2 knockouts, 1 decision),  3 Losses (2 knockouts, 1 decision), 2 Draws
|-  style="text-align:center; background:#e3e3e3;"
|  style="border-style:none none solid solid; "|Res.
|  style="border-style:none none solid solid; "|Record
|  style="border-style:none none solid solid; "|Opponent
|  style="border-style:none none solid solid; "|Type
|  style="border-style:none none solid solid; "|Rd., Time
|  style="border-style:none none solid solid; "|Date
|  style="border-style:none none solid solid; "|Location
|  style="border-style:none none solid solid; "|Notes
|- align=center
|Loss
|align=center|3-3-2||align=left| Norbert Ekassi
|
|
|
|align=left|
|align=left|
|- align=center
|Draw
|align=center|3-2-2||align=left| Glenn McCrory
|
|
|
|align=left|
|align=left|
|- align=center
|Win
|align=center|3-2-1||align=left| Roberto Lenueve
|
|
|
|align=left|
|align=left|
|- align=center
|Loss
|align=center|2-2-1||align=left| Pascal Deban Koffi
|
|
|
|align=left|
|align=left|
|- align=center
|Win
|align=center|2-1-1||align=left| Yves Monsieur
|
|
|
|align=left|
|align=left|
|- align=center
|Loss
|align=center|1-1-1||align=left| Denis Truchet
|
|
|
|align=left|
|align=left|
|- align=center
|Draw
|align=center|1-0-1||align=left| Lumbala Tshibamba
|
|
|
|align=left|
|align=left|
|- align=center
|Win
|align=center|1-0||align=left| Antonio Manfredini
|
|
|
|align=left|
|align=left|
|- align=center

References

External links
 

1962 births
Living people
Heavyweight boxers
Boxers at the 1980 Summer Olympics
Boxers at the 1984 Summer Olympics
Olympic boxers of Algeria
Sportspeople from Oran
Algerian male boxers
Mediterranean Games gold medalists for Algeria
Competitors at the 1983 Mediterranean Games
Competitors at the 1987 Mediterranean Games
African Games silver medalists for Algeria
African Games medalists in boxing
Mediterranean Games medalists in boxing
Competitors at the 1987 All-Africa Games
21st-century Algerian people
20th-century Algerian people